Richard Windeyer (10 August 1806 – 2 December 1847) was a journalist, barrister and Australian politician.

Early life
Richard Windeyer was born in London, the eldest of nine children
of Charles Windeyer, first recognised reporter in the House of Lords, and his wife Ann Mary, née Rudd. Charles Windeyer however, accepted the position of chief clerk in the police office and afterwards became a police magistrate at Sydney. In 1842, Charles was the first Mayor of Sydney. In 1843 Charles Windeyer was an unsuccessful candidate at the first election for the New South Wales Legislative Council, and retired from his magistracy at the end of 1848 with a pension.

Richard Windeyer remained in London and like his father before him became a parliamentary reporter. Richard Windeyer was employed on The Times and other newspapers. On 26 April 1832 Richard Windeyer married Maria née Camfield and their only child, William Charles Windeyer, was born on 29 September 1834. Windeyer studied law and was admitted as a barrister to the Middle Temple in 1834.

Windeyer was advised by his father to travel to New South Wales and on 28 November 1835 arrived in Sydney where he built up a large practice as a barrister. In 1838 Windeyer, along with William Foster and William à Beckett, defended the 11 colonists charged with murder in relation to the Myall Creek massacre. By 1840 he was one of the leaders at the bar and had made a reputation especially in nisi prius work. Windeyer planted thirty acres (12 ha) of vines and made his first wine in 1845. He also raised cattle, horses and pigs and experimented with sugar-cane and wheat.

Parliamentary career
At the first election for the New South Wales Legislative Council held in July 1843, Windeyer was elected for the County of Durham and soon brought in a measure, the Monetary Confidence Bill, designed to relieve the economic depression at the time. In spite of brilliant speeches in opposition to it made by Robert Lowe the bill was carried by 14 votes to seven; however, it was vetoed by the governor, Sir George Gipps, and nothing more was heard of it. Windeyer supported free trade and worked to remove duties on the export of New South Wales tobacco to Van Diemen's Land and wheat to the United Kingdom, but supported an import duty of 1 shilling a bushel on foreign wheat on the basis that it would be a revenue not a protective duty.

In October 1844 Windeyer moved an amendment to a Bill proposing to bring in Lord Stanley's system of national education, to the effect that primary education should be established for the poor 'gratuitously if necessary' and to allow government aid for denominational schools in some circumstances. In 1845 Windeyer, though almost overwhelmed with work, took up the cause of the already fast-dwindling aborigines and obtained a select committee to inquire into the question. He was also in the forefront of the struggle with Gipps concerning generally the powers of the council and the governor on the land question, and in 1846 moved and carried an address to the governor acquainting him that the council could not entertain a Bill he had originated. Windeyer promoted a Libel Act passed 1847, that required that publication of libel could only be justified if it was both true and in the public interest.

Late life and legacy
Windeyer had become financially involved in the long-continued depression and, although he had made a large income at the bar, was obliged to assign his estate. He died on 2 December 1847 while on a visit to friends at Launceston, Tasmania, the result of anxiety and overwork and an internal disease.

Windeyer had a great reputation at the bar as an advocate of much power and ability, and during his short career in parliament showed himself to be a strong and conscientious man. He was a great advocate for representative government and when he died William Wentworth declared he "had lost his right hand man". His early death robbed Australia of a man who might have done his country much service, and reached almost any position in it.

Descendants
He had one child, William Charles Windeyer, who would become Attorney General of NSW (twice, briefly), a Justice of the Supreme Court of NSW and 6th Chancellor of the University of Sydney. His grandson, Richard Windeyer, would become a King's Counsel and Acting Justice of the Supreme Court of NSW. His great-grandson, Victor Windeyer would become a Justice of the High Court of Australia between 1958 and 1972, and would be appointed to the Privy Council in 1963. Another descendant, William Victor Windeyer, would also become a President of the Law Society of New South Wales and a Justice of the Supreme Court of NSW.

References

1806 births
1847 deaths
Members of the New South Wales Legislative Council
Port Stephens Council
Australian people of English descent
19th-century Australian politicians